Days and Nights of Blue Luck Inverted is a studio album by Kip Hanrahan, released in June 1988 and featuring guests including Carmen Lundy, Leo Nocentelli, and Steve Swallow. It made it into jazz reviewer Phillip Watson's top 15 albums of 1988.

Background 
The album was among the first released by record label Pangea, founded by English musician Sting. It took two years to produce. Like its predecessor Vertical's Currency, Days and Nights of Blue Luck Inverted was considered another step in the direction of an avante-garde reimagining of jazz, using elements of world music as its starting point to explore new and interesting directions for jazz.

Critical reception 
On release music reviewer Peter Watrous praised the album in Musician, writing that "Hanrahan avoids the mold; his records constitute one of the more fruitful experiments of the '80s, an experiment that people will want to listen to for a long time. It's also music that sums up the intelligent side of our age, inquisitive, open minded, sensuous. That it existed in the era of Reagan will be one of the mysteries to be debated by social historians." Lee Jeske, writing in Cashbox, described the album's mood as "simmering sensuality - thick and exotic".

Phillip Watson ranked the album among the best released in 1998, writing that "With its 'optional side endings' and enigmatic titles, like its equivocations, its irreverence - it succeeds because it has rules all of its own."

Track listing

Personnel 
 Charles Neville – alto saxophone
 Rolando Napolean Briceno – alto saxophone
 Mario Rivera – baritone saxophone
 Andy Gonzalez – bass
 Milton Cardona – congas
 Orlando Ríos – congas
 Giovanni Hidalgo – congas
 Ignacio Berroa – drums (traps)
 Robbie Ameen – drums (traps)
 Willie Green – drums (traps)
 Jack Bruce – electric bass
 Steve Swallow – electric bass, piano
 Leo Nocentelli – electric guitar
 Anton Fier – percussion (Lyndrum)
 Kip Hanrahan – percussion, guitar, keyboards (Synclavier), voice, percussion (Lyndrum)
 Pablo Ziegler – piano
 Peter Scherer – piano, keyboards (Synclavier)
 David Murray – tenor saxophone
 George Adams – tenor saxophone
 John Stubblefield – tenor saxophone
 Lew Soloff – trumpet
 Jerry Gonzalez – trumpet, congas
 Alfredo Triff – violin
 Carmen Lundy – voice
 Fernando Saunders – voice, electric bass

References 

Kip Hanrahan albums
1988 albums